Sherwood Park Freeway is a  freeway that connects east Edmonton to Sherwood Park in Alberta, Canada. It begins in the Gainer Industrial area where Argyll Road and 82 (Whyte) Avenue merge before intersecting 50 Street. It then curves slightly northeast through industrial areas in southeast Edmonton across 34 Street into Strathcona County, then across 17 Street after which the freeway ends at Anthony Henday Drive. It then continues into Sherwood Park as Wye Road (Highway 630). It is primarily a commuter route, with heavier weekday volume westbound in the morning and eastbound in the afternoon as residents of Sherwood Park commute to Edmonton.

Officially designated by Alberta Transportation as Highway 100, construction of Sherwood Park Freeway was completed in 1968 as a free-flowing alignment of Highway 14 several hundred metres north of the former two-lane road which was then re-signed as Highway 14A, and is now known as 76 Avenue.  Whitemud Drive took over the designation of Highway 14 upon its completion in the late 1990s.

Route description
Sherwood Park Freeway is a suburban freeway with a grass median for its entire length, bisecting industrial and commercial areas in southeast Edmonton and at the western edge of Strathcona County. The freeway begins south of the Kenilworth neighbourhood in the Gainer Industrial area. The freeway then reaches a second diamond interchange at 34 Street and enters Strathcona County. Between 34 Street and Anthony Henday Drive, the boundary between Edmonton and Strathcona County follows the southern edge of Sherwood Park Freeway's right of way. The speed limit is reduced to 80 km/h prior to a third diamond interchange at 17 Street.

Shortly after 17 Street, the freeway meets Anthony Henday Drive at a combination interchange. A high capacity, two-lane, semi-directional flyover carries traffic eastbound on Sherwood Park Freeway to northbound Anthony Henday Drive. The other three left turn movements are provided by loop ramps.  east of Anthony Henday Drive, the Highway 100 and Sherwood Park Freeway designations officially end, and the freeway continues as a major arterial named Wye Road into Sherwood Park. Wye Road continues through Sherwood Park becoming Highway 630 at Highway 21, travelling through the rural areas of Strathcona County, eventually connecting with Highway 14 west of Tofield.

The eastern half of the route from 34 Street to Anthony Henday Drive is designated as Highway 100 by Alberta Transportation, but is not signed as such at any point along the route. The western segment is under the jurisdiction of the City of Edmonton. Between Anthony Henday Drive and 17 Street, Sherwood Park Freeway carried approximately 40,000 vehicles per day in 2019, with heavy westbound volume in the morning peak hours and eastbound in the afternoon as commuters travel to and from the primarily residential community of Sherwood Park.

Strathcona County Transit operates routes 401, 403, and 404 along the freeway to Edmonton from Ordze Transit Centre on Wye Road.

History
In the early 1900s, Wye Road followed the alignment of present-day 76 Avenue out of Edmonton to the east, en route to North Cooking Lake. By the 1920s it had become a secondary unsurfaced thoroughfare, and was later named Highway 14. As Edmonton and the newly developed Sherwood Park grew in the late 1960s, a free-flowing road, Sherwood Park Freeway, was built to link the two on a new alignment of Highway 14 several hundred meters north of Wye Road. The cloverleaf interchange at the freeway's east end was completed in 1965, and the remaining interchanges were completed in 1968. It was four lanes wide and included an additional interchange immediately east of 17 Street that has since been removed. After completion of Sherwood Park Freeway, the existing Highway 14 (76 Avenue) was renamed to Highway 14A. Further south, Whitemud Drive was constructed and eventually extended east to reach Highway 14. It then assumed the designation of Highway 14 to a new terminus at Calgary Trail. The Highway 14A designation has since been removed from 76 Avenue, and the portion of Sherwood Park Freeway within Strathcona County was eventually renumbered Highway 100.

Extensive upgrades to the eastern end of the freeway were finished in 2016 as part of a project completing the final northeast segment of the Anthony Henday Drive ring road. The 17 Street bridge was demolished and reconstructed to be twice as wide with two lanes each way. An interchange linking the freeway to 76 Avenue (formerly Highway 14A) was removed. Westbound Sherwood Park Freeway between Anthony Henday Drive and 17 Street was widened to four lanes, while the eastbound direction is now three lanes wide, up from two lanes each way prior to the project. From 17 Street to the western terminus, both directions remain two lanes wide. Work to rehabilitate the 50 Street bridge was also completed in 2016, extending the structure's surface life for an additional 10–15 years.

Major intersections 

References

External links
Sherwood Park Freeway (Time lapse)

Freeways in Alberta
Roads in Edmonton
Roads in Strathcona County